Corliss P. Stone (1838–1906) was elected mayor of Seattle in 1872.  Prior to election as mayor, Stone had served three terms  as a city council member.  Stone Way North, Stone Avenue North, and Corliss Avenue North, streets in Seattle's Wallingford neighborhood, are named after him.

Stone was notorious for having allegedly embezzled money from his business partner Charles Hiram Burnett Jr. of Seattle. Stone in fact removed the cash from their safe and money from the bank leaving Burnett with the duty of settling the firm's accounts payable. The title to property owned by the firm, however, was turned over to Burnett. Burnett and Stone later negotiated a settlement which allowed Stone to return to Seattle for the purpose of engaging in business independently again.

Stone continued to be active in business and real estate before his death in 1906.

References 
"A Volume of Memoirs and Genealogy of Representative Citizens of the City of Seattle and County of King, Washington." New York and Chicago: Lewis Publishing Co., 1903.  p. 167.
HistoryLink Essay: Voters elect Corliss P. Stone as mayor of the City of Seattle on July 8, 1872
HistoryLink Essay: Seattle Mayor Corliss P. Stone embezzles $15,000 and runs on February 23, 1873

1838 births
1906 deaths
American real estate businesspeople
Mayors of Seattle
19th-century American businesspeople